(born July 13, 1970 in Kanagawa, Japan) is a retired Japanese male butterfly swimmer. He represented Japan at the 1992 Summer Olympics. His best result in two individual starts in Barcelona, Spain was the 17th place (2:01.27) in the Men's 200m Butterfly event.

References
 sports-reference

1970 births
Living people
Olympic swimmers of Japan
Swimmers at the 1992 Summer Olympics
Asian Games medalists in swimming
Swimmers at the 1990 Asian Games
Japanese male butterfly swimmers
Asian Games silver medalists for Japan
Asian Games bronze medalists for Japan
Medalists at the 1990 Asian Games
20th-century Japanese people